The FDF National Camp (Danish: "FDF Landslejr"), formerly also called Julsølejr, is a nationwide youth camp organized by the Danish Christian youth organization FDF every five years at the FDF Outdoor Center Sletten near . With more than 10,000 participants, it is one of the biggest children and youth camps in Denmark.

Activities 
The camps are designed to give children and young people the opportunity to increase experience in nature, with music and a new kind of celebrating divine services.

History
Since 1926, FDF has hosted a big national camp ("FDF National Camp", "Camp Julsoe") every five years. The national camp takes place in Sletten. The camp lasts 10 days and all members over the age of nine can take part. In 2011 there were 13,000 participants. More than 500 international guests from FDF's partner organizations took part, as well.

See also
Frivilligt Drenge- og Pige-Forbund (FDF)
Fimcap
FDF Outdoor Center Sletten

References

Skanderborg Municipality
Youth work
Fimcap
Youth organizations based in Denmark
Christian summer camps